At the 1956 Summer Olympics in Melbourne, two events in modern pentathlon were contested.

Medal summary

Medal table

Participating nations
A total of 40 athletes from 16 nations competed at the Melbourne Games:

References

External links
 

 
1956 Summer Olympics events
1956